Daniel Monzoro Fontana (born December 31, 1975, in General Roca, Río Negro) is an Argentine-born Italian professional triathlete. Fontana started out as a swimmer in Argentina, until he began his triathlon career in 1994, while racing for his homeland. He first competed at two Pan-American Games (1999 and 2003), and at the 2004 Summer Olympics in Athens, as part of the Argentina team, where he placed twenty-eighth in the men's triathlon, with a time of 1:57:14. In 2006, Fontana relocated to Italy, and became a naturalized citizen to take his athletic abilities to a higher level.

At the peak of his career, Fontana has won seven titles in triathlon, four for Argentina and the other three for Italy. He had also achieved three top fifteen placements at the World Olympic Distance, including his eighth-place finish in 2005, which considered highest by an Italian male. Fontana also qualified for the 2008 Summer Olympics in Beijing, and competed for the Italian team in men's triathlon. He finished only in thirty-third place, with a time of 1:52:39.

Following his second Olympic participation, Fontana opted to run for the long-distance triathlon, and competed at the 2009 Ironman 70.3 World Championship in Clearwater, Florida, United States, where he finished second behind Germany's Michael Raelert with a time of 1:12:00. He was also able to beat New Zealand-born U.S. triathlete Matt Reed, who finished behind him at the Olympics, during the race. Fontana also obtained his third-place finish at the Ironman series in South Africa with the time of 8:18:51, and two championship titles at the 2011 Ironman 70.3 World Series in Pucón, Chile and in Pescara, Italy.

In 2012, Fontana performed well with a second-place finishes at the TriStar Cannes tournament, and at the 2012 Ironman 70.3 World Series, although he had suffered some physical injuries during the race.

On March 30, 2014, Daniel was first on the podium at the Ironman Los Cabos with a stunning 8h26'15", first Italian winning a race of the Ironman Championship.

Fontana is currently a member of an Italian professional triathlon team, Dimensione Dello Sport (DDS), coached by Simone Diamantini. He resides in Settimo Milanese, Italy.

References

External links
Official site

1975 births
Argentine male triathletes
Italian male triathletes
Living people
Olympic triathletes of Argentina
Olympic triathletes of Italy
Triathletes at the 1999 Pan American Games
Triathletes at the 2003 Pan American Games
Triathletes at the 2004 Summer Olympics
Triathletes at the 2008 Summer Olympics
Duathletes
Pan American Games competitors for Argentina
People from General Roca